A market-implied rating estimates the market observed default probability of an individual, corporation, or even a country. Indeed, a credit rating is simply a probability of default. The methodology used by Moodys consists in a median piecewise fit of the ratings to the credit defaut swap data observed on the market. S&P however uses a log regression between the log cds and the ratings equivalent number, adjusted to  firm specifics, continent, and outlook.

See also
 Alternative data
 Credit risk
 Default (finance)
 Credit history
 Credit score
 Risk-based pricing

References

Credit